Charles A. Flynn (born ) is a United States Army general who serves as commanding general of United States Army Pacific since June 4, 2021. He previously served as Deputy Chief of Staff for Operations, Plans and Training  (G3/5/7) of the Army Staff from June 2019 to May 2021.  He is the younger brother of Lieutenant General Michael T. Flynn, Donald Trump's first National Security Advisor.

Background
Flynn was raised in Middletown, Rhode Island, and graduated from Middletown High School in 1981. Flynn received his commission via the Army Reserve Officers' Training Corps at the University of Rhode Island in 1985. He earned a Bachelor of Science in Marketing from the University of Rhode Island in 1985.

Military career

Flynn received a Master of Arts in National Security and Strategic Studies from the Naval War College in 1997 and a Master of Science in Joint Campaign Planning and Strategy from the Joint Advanced Warfighting School within the Joint Forces Staff College of National Defense University.

At the start of his career, Flynn became qualified as an Infantry officer. In addition, he completed the Ranger, Airborne, and Pathfinder courses. His early assignments included: commander of A Company, 4th Battalion, 325th Infantry Regiment and commander of A Company 2nd Battalion, 75th Ranger Regiment. He also served as operations officer (S-3) of  1st Battalion, 27th Infantry Regiment and 2nd Brigade Combat Team, 25th Infantry Division.

Flynn subsequently commanded 2nd Battalion, 504th Infantry Regiment, which included deployment for Operation Enduring Freedom and Operation Iraqi Freedom. He deployed to Iraq again as commander of 1st Brigade Combat Team, 82nd Airborne Division. He later served as executive assistant to the Director of the Joint Staff and executive officer for the commander of International Security Assistance Force, United States Forces – Afghanistan. Flynn went on to serve as director of the Mission Command Center of Excellence (MCCOE) and acting commander of the United States Army Combined Arms Center.

As Flynn advanced through the general officer ranks, he served as the 82nd Airborne Division's deputy commander for operations and assistant operations officer for readiness (G-3/5/7) for United States Army Forces Command. He commanded the 25th Infantry Division from 2014 to 2016, then was assigned as deputy commander of United States Army Pacific. He next served as  assistant deputy chief of staff for operations (G-3/5/7) at Headquarters Department of the Army. In June 2019, Flynn was assigned as deputy chief of staff for operations (G3/5/7).

On November 30, 2020, his nomination for promotion to general was submitted to the U.S. Senate and was confirmed by voice vote of the full Senate on December 20, 2020. On January 25, 2021, the Department of Defense announced that Flynn will be the next commander of the United States Army Pacific at Fort Shafter in Honolulu. He assumed that command in a change of command ceremony at Fort Shafter, Hawaii on June 4, 2021.

U.S. Capitol attack

During the 2021 storming of the United States Capitol, a conference call took place between Capitol police, D.C. officials, and Pentagon officials. In that call, the  Chief of the Capitol police made "an urgent, urgent immediate request for National Guard assistance", telling them he needed "boots on the ground". However, Lieutenant General Walter E. Piatt, Director of the Army Staff, said he could not recommend the request be approved. Initially denying his involvement, the Army later confirmed that Flynn had participated in the phone call, although claimed he cannot remember if he said anything on the critical call about deploying National Guard, but others on the call reported hearing his voice. In early December 2021, Colonel Earl G. Matthews released a memo that accused Flynn of making willful distortions of the events of January 6, describing Flynn and LTG Walter E. Piatt as "absolute and unmitigated liars" and of giving “perjured testimony before Congress”. Charles Flynn's role drew scrutiny in light of his brother Michael's recent calls for martial law and a redo election overseen by the military.

Awards and decorations

Other awards

Personal life
Flynn and his wife Kathleen have three children: Molly, Sean, and Tara.

References

1960s births
Living people
University of Rhode Island alumni
Naval War College alumni
Joint Forces Staff College alumni
United States Army generals
Recipients of the Distinguished Service Medal (US Army)
Recipients of the Legion of Merit
People from Middletown, Rhode Island
Military personnel from Rhode Island
Recipients of the Meritorious Service Medal (United States)